Turacin is a naturally occurring red pigment that is 6% copper complexed to uroporphyrin III. Arthur Herbert Church discovered turacin in 1869.

It is found only in the bird family Musophagidae, the turacos. Other birds derive their red coloration from carotenoids (bright and orange-reds) or phaeomelanins (rusty and brownish-reds).

It is often assumed that this coloration will wash out when the birds are bathing or after heavy rains, but this is true only if the water used for bathing happens to be very alkaline.

See also 
 Psittacofulvin, a brightly colored red and yellow pigment unique to parrots
 Turacoverdin, green pigment unique to turacos

References 

Biological pigments